Deceived by Trust is a 1995 American made-for-television drama film directed by Chuck Bowman. It stars ex-Hunter co-star Stepfanie Kramer, Shannon Fill, Conor O'Farrell, and Michael Gross. The film made its debut on NBC on 23 October 1995.

Plot 
When a beautiful high student named Cindy (Fill) is sexually harassed by Dr. Gordon Powell (Gross), the principal at her high school, she seeks out guidance counselor Sarah Collins (Kramer). Throughout the film, Collins undertakes some very drastic measures intended to get Dr. Powell fired from his job as principal. Later, Cindy transfers to another school after recanting her story. Just when nothing seems to have come to pass, Collins soon discovers that Dr. Powell has had a history of sexually harassing other female students, so the question becomes "can Collins ever prove Dr. Powell's guilt before he strikes again?".

Cast
Stepfanie Kramer as Sarah Collins
Michael Gross as Dr. Gordon Powell
Shannon Fill as Cindy
Molly Parker as Rachel Morton
Conor O'Farrell as Frank Kerns
Teryl Rothery as Janet Harrison

References

External links

1995 television films
1995 films
1995 drama films
NBC network original films
American drama television films
Films directed by Chuck Bowman
1990s American films